New Utrecht High School is a public high school located in Bensonhurst, a neighborhood of Brooklyn, New York. The school is operated by the New York City Department of Education under District 20 and serves students of grades 9 to 12. It is one of the largest high schools in New York City in enrollment.

History 
New Utrecht High School was established in 1915 as an offshoot of the nearby coeducational Bay Ridge High School. New Utrecht High School became an all-boys school, while Bay Ridge High School became an all-girls school.

The school's first location was a wooden building on 86th Street and 18th Avenue, with a population of 350 students. Irving Hazen was the founding principal, and he adopted the white and green colors of his alma mater, Dartmouth College, as the school's colors.

In November 1924, the school moved to its present location on 80th Street and 16th Avenue, with 2,300 students. In February of the following year, girls were admitted, resulting in the school becoming coeducational. Over the next few years, the school continued to grow, consisting of a main building and four annexes, with a student population of nearly 11,000. It was the largest student body in the world at the time.

New Utrecht High School was the scene of several racial conflicts between blacks and whites within the community in the 1970s to 1990s. In 1974, 300 black students stormed the school after a fight between a black student and a white student ended up with the former being injured, spurring rumors that it was a racial attack. In 1990, a black student was shot by a group of white students stemming from an incident in the locker room.

In the 2000s, New Utrecht High School underwent a major overhaul. It added a new, two-story cafeteria building, which replaced the old cafeteria located in the main building. The old cafeteria was subsequently turned into classroom space. A new entrance was also created, accompanied by a corridor connecting the cafeteria building with the main building.

Today, New Utrecht High School functions as a zoned school primarily serving students living in the neighborhoods of Bensonhurst and Dyker Heights in Brooklyn, New York.

Curriculum
New Utrecht High School offers Advanced Placement courses, including:
 
 AP Calculus AB
 AP Calculus BC
 AP Statistic
 AP World History: Modern
 AP Human Geography 
 AP United States History 
 AP United States Government and Politics
 AP Comparative Government and Politics
 AP Microeconomics
 AP Macroeconomics
 AP English Language and Composition
 AP English Literature and Composition
 AP Chemistry
 AP Physics
 AP Biology
 AP Environmental Science
 AP Psychology
 AP Computer Science A
 AP Art History
 AP Chinese Language & Culture
 AP Italian Language & Culture
 AP Spanish Language & Culture

Academies
There are several academies (programs that offer employment-oriented training in specialized fields) at New Utrecht High School, which include:
 
 Academy of Business and Technology
 Academy of Medical Professions and Health Careers
 Academy of Legal Studies
 Academy of Hospitality and Tourism
 Academy of Art and Design
 Academy of Asian Studies
 Academy of Computer Science
 Honors Academy
 
Some academies are associated with NAF, a non-profit organization originally known as the National Academy Foundation.

Extracurricular activities

Student government
New Utrecht High School has an active student government elected every October. For nearly a century, the student government positions were mayor, deputy mayor, secretary, treasurer, and student representatives from each grade. The mayoral theme was a longstanding tradition that stemmed from the fact that the neighborhood of New Utrecht was named by Dutch settlers after the city of Utrecht in the Netherlands. In 2015, the student government changed the name of the two significant positions of mayor and deputy mayor to student body president and vice president. The New Utrecht High School Student Government is responsible for allocating funds to clubs and organizing a School Spirit Week, a Thanksgiving Dinner, a Toy Drive, and other annual school-wide events.

There is also a Senior Council composed of a president, vice president, secretary, and treasurer. The Senior Council is responsible for organizing Senior events, such as the Senior Class Brunch and Senior Trip, creating the Senior Class sweatshirts, voicing concerns of the Senior Class to the administration, and keeping the Senior Class informed.

School leadership team
The School Leadership Team (SLT) comprises representatives from the school administration, parents, teachers, and students. The students are usually two active students, one junior and one senior, who voice the student body's concerns. The SLT meets monthly to discuss and work on issues related to implementing the school's mission and vision. A PTA meeting follows immediately after.

Productions
Four productions are held annually at New Utrecht High School: the Talent Show, the Chinese New Year Show, the Fashion Show, and the International Show.

The Talent Show is open to anyone with talent, whether singing, dancing, magic, comedy, or any other form of entertainment. The sound, lighting, stage, construction, and booklet crew are composed entirely of students. The show is usually held in December.

The Chinese New Year Show involves singing, dancing, acting, and other entertainment forms revolving around Chinese culture. The Chinese Club at New Utrecht High School partners with a non-profit organization called the Chinese-American Planning Council.

The Fashion Show production at New Utrecht High School is student-run and consists of students in the New Utrecht Fashion Society creating clothes and having their friends model them. The show is usually held in March or April.

Like the others, the International Show is held in April or May and is entirely student-run. It is similar to the Talent Show but focuses on other countries worldwide.

Notable alumni

Notable alums of New Utrecht High School include:

Walter Adams (1922–1998): economist, university president
Koby Altman (born 1982): professional basketball general manager
Carmine Appice (born 1946): musician, drummer
Steve Augeri (born 1959): singer
Troy Ave (born 1985): rapper
Lord Have Mercy (born 1973): rapper 
Gene Barry (born Eugene Klass; 1919–2009): actor
Seymour Benzer (1921–2007): biologist
Barbara Aronstein Black (born 1933): academic dean
Abe Burrows (1910–1985): playwright
Pat Capri (1918–1989): professional baseball player
Jack Carter: comedian
Ronald Castorina: politician 
Phyllis Chesler: feminist author, psychologist
Joseph Colombo (1923–1978): criminal
Louis "Louie Bagels" Daidone (born 1946): criminal
Billy DeMars (1925–2020): professional baseball player, coach
Max Desfor (1913–2018): photographer 
Amram Ducovny (1927–2003): writer
Stanley Ellin: author
Jerry Ferrara: actor
Cy Feuer: playwright, stage director, producer
Stanley Fink (1936–1997): politician
Eli Friedman (born 1933): nephrologist
Leo Friedman: Broadway photographer
Allen Funt (1914–1999): TV personality
GASHI (born 1989): rapper
David Geffen (born 1943): media mogul
Ralph Ginzburg (1929–2006): author, editor, publisher, photojournalist
Bernice Gottlieb (née Bernice Friedman; born 1931): pioneer in the transracial adoption movement, real estate executive
Philip Habib (1920–1992): diplomat
Buddy Hackett (born Leonard Hacker; 1924–2003): comedian
Barbara Grizzuti Harrison: writer
Sal Iacono: television comedian
David Ignatow: poet, author
Gabe Kaplan (born 1945): comic, actor, poker player
Michael Kidd (1915–2007): choreographer
Harvey Lembeck (1923–1982): actor
Howard Levy: dermatologist, Vietnam War resister
Steve Lombardi: professional wrestler
Paulie Malignaggi: professional boxer
 Harold Martin (1918–2010): politician
Patty McCormack: actress
Robert Merrill (1917–2004): opera singer
Walter Mischel (1930–2018): psychologist famous for the Marshmallow Test and contributions to personality and social psychology
Art Modell (1925–2012): businessman, entrepreneur, professional sports team owner
Doretta Morrow: actress
Sam Nahem (1915–2004): professional baseball player
Angela "Big Ang" Raiola: TV personality
Anthony Ramos: actor, singer 
Teddy Reig (1918–1984): jazz record producer, promoter, artist manager
Daniel Rodriguez: singer
 Stan Rosen (1906–1984): professional football player
Spencer Ross: sportscaster
Herschel Savage: pornographic actor
John Saxon (1935–2020): actor
Ralph Snyderman (born 1940): physician, scientist, administrator
Arnold Stang: comedian, actor
Martha Stewart (1922–2021): film and TV actress, singer
Tony Visconti (born 1944): music producer

In popular culture
New Utrecht High School is the venue for key scenes in the 1947 movie It Happened in Brooklyn, starring Frank Sinatra, Kathryn Grayson, Jimmy Durante, and Peter Lawford.

The front and rear views of the school building were used in the opening and closing scenes of the TV sitcom Welcome Back, Kotter, which starred alumnus Gabe Kaplan.

Gallery

References

External links

 School Website
 DOE Website

Educational institutions established in 1915
Public high schools in Brooklyn
Bensonhurst, Brooklyn
1915 establishments in New York City